The Mauthausen-Gusen camp trials were a set of trials of SS concentration camp personnel following World War II, heard by an American military government court at Dachau. Between March 29 and May 13, 1946, and then from August 6 to August 21, 1947, a total of 69 former camp personnel were tried. Among them were some of the former guards at the Mauthausen-Gusen concentration camp system and August Eigruber, a former Gauleiter of Upper Austria.

Origins
In 1942, overwhelming reports of German atrocities and large scale massacres against concentration camp inhabitants came to surface from exiled governments and Jewish organizations. With increased tension from the public and overwhelming evidence, the Allied powers being the United States, Great Britain, and the Soviet Union had no choice but to intervene. The Allied powers issued a statement condemning the actions of those involved and promising to bring each and every SS personnel to justice with no chance of dismissal. The Allied nations' foreign ministers met in Russia a year later and were better known as ‘The Big Three’. Those who committed war crimes were broken up into two war crimes categories. These groups were divided by those with no particular geographic location who would be punished by the Allies, and those who committed crimes within a specific location who would be tried in courts within their jurisdiction. The United States involvement within the trials had difficulties ranging from a lack of international policy knowledge and being understaffed, which led to pure chaos. Those sent to investigate the war crimes lacked proper training which yielded reports with sub-par information. The U.S. encountered countless obstacles. Ultimately in 1945, the United States committed to two distinct war crimes trial programs, one under American military jurisdiction and one in collaboration with the Allied powers.

First Mauthausen camp trial 

The first trial of personnel from Mauthausen-Gusen took place in the Dachau concentration camp between March 29 and May 13, 1946. Among the accused were 60 former members of the camp's administration and August Eigruber, a former Gauleiter of Upper Austria. Among the defendants were also Viktor Zoller (former commander of the SS-Totenkopfverbande guard battalion), and doctors Friedrich Entress (an SS member and a medic who practiced medical experiments on hundreds of inmates; killing most of them with injections of phenol), Eduard Krebsbach and Erich Wasicky handed the Zyklon B to the person who was responsible for running camp's gas chambers who was Dr. Eduard Krebsbach based on the deathbed confession of Commander Ziereis. The Mauthausen-Gusen commander, Franz Ziereis, was shot several weeks after the liberation of the Mauthausen-Gusen camps and died in former Camp Gusen I on May 24, 1945.

The defendants were charged with "violations of the laws and usages of war," a charge which encompassed among other things murder, torture, beating and starving the inmates. After six weeks all 61 defendants were found guilty. 58 were sentenced to death by hanging (9 were had their sentences were changed to life imprisonment and were later paroled), while three others were sentenced to life imprisonment. All but one of the death sentences were carried out on May 27 and May 28 of 1947 at Landsberg Prison. The sole exception was Otto Striegel, who won a last-minute stay of execution. Striegel was hanged on June 20, 1947.

Defendants 
The defendants of the first Mauthausen camp trial (US v. Hans Altfuldisch, et al.), and their sentences, are as follows:

 August Eigruber – death by hanging
 Viktor Zoller – death by hanging
 Friedrich Entress – death by hanging
 Hans Altfuldisch – death by hanging
 Josef Riegler – death by hanging
 Willy Brünning (Gusen) – death by hanging
 Emil Müller – death by hanging
 Kurt Keilwtz – death by hanging
 Franz Kautny – death by hanging
 Johannes Grimm (DEST-Wienergraben) – death by hanging
 Adolf Zutter – death by hanging
 Eduard Krebsbach – death by hanging
 Heinrich Häger – death by hanging
 Hans Spatzenneger – death by hanging
 Otto Striegel – death by hanging
 Werner Grahn – death by hanging
 Wilhelm Jobst – death by hanging
 Georg Gössl – death by hanging
 Hans Diehl – death by hanging
 Paul Kaiser (Gusen) – death by hanging
 Waldemar Wolter – death by hanging
 Gustav Kreindl – death by hanging
 Willy Eckert – death by hanging
 Hermann Pribyll – death by hanging
 Josef Leeb – death by hanging
 Wilhelm Henkel – death by hanging
 Kapo Willy Frey – death by hanging
 Leopold Trauner (DEST-Gusen) – death by hanging
 Wilhelm Müller – death by hanging
 Heinrich Eisenhöfer – death by hanging
 Andreas Trumm – death by hanging
 Rudolf Mynzak – death by hanging
 Erich Meissner – death by hanging
 Kapo Rudolf Fiegl (Gusen) – death by hanging
 Josef Niedermayer – death by hanging
 Julius Ludolf – death by hanging
 Hans Hegenscheidt – death by hanging
 Franz Huber – death by hanging
 Erich Wasicky – death by hanging
 Theophil Priebel – death by hanging
 Kaspar Klimowitsch (Gusen II) – death by hanging
 Heinrich Fitschok (Gusen II) – death by hanging
 Anton Kaufmann (DEST-Gusen) – death by hanging
 Stefan Barczey – death by hanging
 Karl Struller – death by hanging
 August Blei – death by hanging
 Otto Drabeck – death by hanging
 Vincenz Nohel – death by hanging
 Thomas Sigmund (Gusen) – death by hanging
 Heinrich Giese (Gusen) – death by hanging (changed to life imprisonment)
 Walter Höhler – death by hanging (changed to life imprisonment)
 Adolf Rutka (Gusen) – death by hanging (changed to life imprisonment)
 Ludwig Dörr (Gusen II) – death by hanging (changed to life imprisonment)
 Viktor Korger (Gusen II) – death by hanging (changed to life imprisonment)
 Karl Billman (Gusen II) – death by hanging (changed to life imprisonment)
 Herbert Grzybowski (Gusen) – death by hanging (changed to life imprisonment)
 Wilhelm Mack (Gusen) – death by hanging (changed to life imprisonment)
 Ferdinand Lappert (Gusen) – death by hanging (changed to life imprisonment)
 Michael Cserny – life imprisonment
 Paul Gützlaff (Gusen) – life imprisonment
 Josef Mayer – life imprisonment

Second Mauthausen camp trial 

The second Mauthausen camp trial started on August 6, 1947. Altogether 8 former members of the camp's administration were accused of the same set of crimes as in the former trial. On August 21 the verdict was reached. Four Nazis were sentenced to death by hanging, one for life imprisonment, two for short-term sentences and one was acquitted of all the charges. Three of the death sentences were carried out on November 19, 1948. The death sentence against Michael Heller was reduced to life in prison in 1949.

Defendants 
The defendants of the second Mauthausen camp trial (US v. Franz Kofler, et al. ), and their sentences, are as follows:

 Franz Kofler – death by hanging (executed on November 19, 1948)
 Gustav Petrat – death by hanging (executed on November 19, 1948)
 Kapo Quirin Flaucher – death by hanging (executed on November 19, 1948)
 Michael Heller – death by hanging (changed to life imprisonment)
 Emil Thielmann – life imprisonment
 Hermann Franz Bütgen – 3 years in prison
 Arno Albert Reuter – 2 years in prison
 Stefan Lennart – acquitted

Additional trials 
An additional 56 trials took place between March and November 1947 within the framework of the Mauthausen cases of individuals or small groups.

References 

 Robert Sigel: Im Interesse der Gerechtigkeit. Die Dachauer Kriegsverbrecherprozesse 1945–48. Campus, Frankfurt am Main 1992, .
 Ute Stiepani: Die Dachauer Prozesse und ihre Bedeutung im Rahmen der alliierten Strafverfolgung von NS-Verbrechen. In: Gerd R. Ueberschär: Die alliierten Prozesse gegen Kriegsverbrecher und Soldaten 1943–1952. Fischer, Frankfurt am Main 1999, .
 Review and Recommendations of the Deputy Judge Advocate for War Crimes: United States of America v. Hans Altfuldisch et al. – Case No. 000.50.5 Originaldokument Mauthausen-Hauptprozess, 30. April 1947 (englisch, PDF-Datei)
 Florian Freund: Der Dachauer Mauthausenprozess. In: Dokumentationsarchiv des österreichischen Widerstandes. Jahrbuch 2001. Wien 2001, S. 35–66.
 Bertrand Perz: Prozesse zum KZ Mauthausen. In: Ludwig Eiber, Robert Sigl (Hrsg.): Dachauer Prozesse – NS-Verbrechen vor amerikanischen Militärgerichten in Dachau 1945–1948. Wallstein, Göttingen 2007, .

 
Holocaust trials